Danzik (also, Ashaga-Danzik, Yukhari-Danzik, and Yukhary Danzik) is a former village in the Nakhchivan Autonomous Republic of Azerbaijan.

References 

Populated places in Azerbaijan
History of Nakhchivan